Anastasia Msosa (born 1950) was the Chief Justice of Malawi.

Msosa started her career as a State Advocate in 1975 and later worked in the Department of Legal Aid as a Legal Aid Advocate. In 1990, she became Registrar General. In 1992, she was appointed the first Malawian female judge of the High Court and, later in 1997 she went to the Supreme Court of Appeals. She was appointed Chief Justice in 2013, becoming the first female Chief Justice in the country, succeeding Chief Justice Lovemore Munlo after his resignation from the position. 

Msosa retired in 2015 at the age of 65.
She also served as Chairperson of the Malawi Electoral Commission for the first Parliamentary and Presidential Elections in Malawi from 1993 to 1998. She was reappointed Chairperson of Malawi Electoral Commission in 2004 until 2012. 
S

Msosa is married to accountant Anderson Msosa and has 7 children.

References

Living people
1950 births
20th-century Malawian judges
Malawian women lawyers
Chief justices of Malawi
21st-century Malawian judges